The Indiana gas boom was a period of active drilling and production of natural gas in the Trenton Gas Field, in the US state of Indiana and the adjacent northwest part of Ohio. The boom began in the early 1880s and lasted into the early 20th century.

When the Indiana natural gas belt was discovered, the citizens were unaware of what they had found. Nearly a decade passed without action to recover the resource. Once its significance was realized, further exploration showed the Indiana gas belt was the largest deposit of natural gas discovered until then. In addition to the massive quantity of natural gas, in the 1890s developers discovered that the field also contained the first giant oil reserve found in the US, with an estimated one billion barrels of oil. The resource was rapidly tapped for use.  Because the gas was being wasted in use, the Indiana General Assembly attempted to regulate its use.  In a series of cases, the Indiana Supreme Court upheld the constitutionality of the law.

The poor understanding of oil and gas wells at the time led to the loss of an estimated 90% of the natural gas by venting into the atmosphere or by widespread misuse.  By 1902 the yield from the fields began to decline, leading to a switch to alternative forms of energy. With most of the gas removed from the field, there was no longer enough pressure to pump the oil out of the ground.  An estimated  of oil remain in the field.  Advancements in artificial lift technology have led to extraction of some of the oil, but at a relatively slow rate and high cost compared to more productive fields.

Discovery

Natural gas was first discovered in Indiana in 1876. Coal miners in the town of Eaton were boring a hole in search of coal. The event scared the miners. Some believed that they had breached the ceiling of Hell. They plugged the hole and did not drill any more at that location.

In 1886, Indiana's first commercial gas well was established when George W. Carter, William W. Worthington, and Robert C. Bell hired Almeron H. Crannell to drill another well in Eaton. When the escaping gas was ignited, the flame reached 10 feet into the air. Other gas wells were drilled, and in instances, the escaping gas was ignited to advertise the discovery, with the assumption the gas inexhaustible. The resultant flame was called a flambeaux.

Gas fever swept the state and thousands of gas wells were created. The belt came to be called the Trenton Gas Field. Drillers found large quantities of oil in addition to the natural gas.

Boom

The gas discovery stimulated the development of industry in East Central Indiana. The Ball Corporation opened in Muncie, using the cheap fuel to make glass. Other manufacturers also moved into the area, including the Kokomo Rubber Company; Hemmingray Bottle and Insulating Glass Company; and Maring, Hart, and Company.

Iron and other metal manufacturers, attracted by the cheap fuel, established factories. The cheap fuel was a primary reason U.S. Steel chose northern Indiana for their operations. Other cities across northern Indiana also grew, including Hartford City and Gas City. In 1892 Gas City had a population of 150, but two years later its population had increased to 25,000.

Cities outside the field were piped gas, and the fuel was exported across the Midwest. The Indiana Natural Gas and Oil was formed by a group of Chicago businessmen led by Charles Yerkes. One major use for the gas was to power lighting. The wealth and industry brought by the wells led to a rapid population shift into northern Indiana. Southern Indiana, by comparison, had never recovered from the embargo during the Civil War and was in economic decline. The northern part of the state attracted new jobs. The boom led to rapid development of pumping and piping technology by the region’s gas and oil companies. Inventors, such as Elwood Haynes, developed many different devices and methods that advanced the industry.

As the use of the gas grew, many scientists warned that more gas was being wasted than was effectively used by industry, and that the supplies would soon run out. Almost every town in northern Indiana had one or more gas wells.  Producers lit a flambeau atop each well to demonstrate the gas was flowing. The Indiana General Assembly attempted to stop the practice by limiting open burning. The law met with tough opposition.  Many town leaders, who had come to rely on the gas revenues dismissed claims that the wells would run dry. This practice wasted much gas; INGO conducted its own investigation and found that its flambeaus wasted $10,000 in gas daily, and ordered the practice stopped. Despite their findings, the other companies did not follow their example. Although INGO implemented anti-waste measures, they were virulently opposed to the regulations that they viewed as hampering to productivity—primarily the regulations aimed at artificially increasing gas pressure.

Elwood Haynes filed a suit a month after the regulations were passed into law, claiming that the government had no authority to regulate the industry. The challenge dragged on in court for several years until the Indiana Supreme Court declared the regulatory laws constitutional in 1896.

Almost every community in the Trenton Field had a gas well. Many were purchased by local governments, which used revenues for community amenities.  Many towns and cities installed free gas lighting throughout their communities, supplied by their own gas wells.  Communities also piped gas to private homes to provide cheap heating fuel, helping to make urban living more desirable. Gas was used to produce electricity that ran electric street cars in several cities.  Businessmen also established corporations to purchase the gas from the local markets and sell it wholesale on the national market.

Decline

Wasteful practices rapidly depleted the gas field.  By the turn of the century, output from the wells began to decline.  Some flambeaus had been burning for nearly two decades; slowly their flames became shorter and weaker. Modern experts estimate that as much as 90% of the natural gas was wasted in flambeau displays. By 1903 factories' and towns' need for alternate sources of energy led to creation of numerous coal-burning electric plants.

Oil lasted a few years longer, but inexperience in the early oil drilling industry led to problems. Producers were unaware of the relation between the pressure provided by natural gas and the ability to pump oil from wells. The pressure began to decline rapidly towards the turn of century. In 1895 the pressure was at 164 psi, in 1897 it was 191 psi, in 1898 173 psi. As the pressure decreased to around 150 psi, oil began to move into the upper part of the field, but since the natural gas had been released and pressure dropped between 130 psi, there was no way to pump out the remaining oil in the field.

Oil production in Indiana peaked in 1905 with over  pumped that year. By 1910 the once abundant resources had slowed to a trickle. By then new industry had moved into the state, and decline of the gas industry did not have a major negative impact. The availability of cheap energy had drawn so much new industry that Indiana had become one of the leading industrial states. The economy of northern Indiana continued to flourish until the Great Depression began in the following decade.

Smaller pockets of natural gas exist in Indiana at depths that could not be reached in the boom era. The state still had a small natural gas producing industry in 2008, but residents and industry consume about twice as much natural gas as the state produces. In 2005 there were 338 active natural gas wells on the Trenton Field. This made it the 24th largest producing state, far below the major producers.

It is estimated that only 10% of the oil was drilled from the Trenton Field, and approximately  may remain. Because of the size of the field, pumping gas back into the well to increase pressure, as is commonly done in smaller fields, is impossible. Because of the depth and limitations of hydraulic pumps, it was never cost effective to use them to extract oil. It was not until the 1990s that efficient methods of artificial lift were invented.  This has allowed some of the oil to extracted, but at far higher cost than when sufficient natural gas is present.

See also

History of Indiana
Peak gas
Trenton Limestone

Notes

Sources

External links

Oil and Gas in Indiana
"Natural Gas Boom, Tipton County," poem by Jared Carter

Commodity booms
Economy of Indiana
History of Indiana
Natural gas in the United States